University of Zenica (Bosnian: Univerzitet u Zenici) is a public university located in Zenica, Bosnia and Herzegovina. The university was founded in 2000, when faculties in Zenica decided to separate from the University of Sarajevo.

History
The college of metallurgy was established in 1950 and has been transferred to Faculty of Metallurgy in 1961 as an outside faculty of the University of Sarajevo. From there more faculties were added and enrollment increased, until an independent University was created by the Parliament of Zenica-Doboj Canton in 2000. The University is member of the Balkan Universities Network.

Faculties 
 Faculty of Metallurgy and Technology
 Faculty of Mechanical Engineering
 Faculty of Philosophy
 Faculty of Economics
 Faculty of Law
 Medical Faculty
 Faculty of Islamic Pedagogy
 Polytechnic Faculty

Institutes 

 Institute "Kemal Kapetanović"

Graduate promotion 

The University hosts annual promotion ceremony for all graduate students of both BA and MA study programme. The ceremony is held every October in Arena Zenica.

See also
 List of universities in Bosnia and Herzegovina
 Education in Bosnia and Herzegovina

References

External links
 

Buildings and structures in Zenica
Universities in Bosnia and Herzegovina
Educational institutions established in 2000
2000 establishments in Bosnia and Herzegovina